
Pila Qucha (Quechua pila hose qucha lake, "hose lake", hispanicized spellings Pila Cocha, Pila Khocha, Pilakhocha) is a Bolivian lake located in the Cochabamba Department, Tiraque Province, Tiraque Municipality, Tiraque Canton situated about 4,019 m high.

References 

Lakes of Cochabamba Department